Mawruma (Aymara mawri a little fish which lives in the Altiplano, uma water, "mawri water(s)", possibly erroneously also spelled Maruma) is a  mountain in the Peruvian Andes. It is situated in the Moquegua Region, Mariscal Nieto Province, Carumas District, and in the Puno Region, El Collao Province, Santa Rosa District. Mawruma lies southwest of the mountain Jisk'a Mawruma ("little Mawruma", Jiscamauroma), northwest of Chuqi Quta and Qiwña Milluku, and southeast of Qina Qinani. Southeast of Mawruma an intermittent stream named Mawrini ("the one with mawri", Maurini) originates. It flows to the northeast.

References

Mountains of Moquegua Region
Mountains of Puno Region
Mountains of Peru